Prosenjit Chatterjee is an Indian film actor, producer and television presenter, who works predominantly in Bengali and Hindi language films. He debuted as a child actor in the Hrishikesh Mukherjee-directorial Chotto Jigyasa, for which he has won the Bengal Film Journalists' Association – Most Outstanding Work of the Year Award. After a string of films where he acted as a child actor, he made his debut as a lead actor in Duti Pata, which was a critically and commercially unsuccessful.

In 1987, Prosenjit's breakthrough role came opposite Vijeta Pandit in Amar Sangi; a highly successful romantic drama directed by Sujit Guha. He made his debut in Hindi cinema with the David Dhawan-directorial Aandhiyan. Following this, he went on to act in numerous commercial films until 2003, when he acted in Chokher Bali. He earned critical acclaim for playing the role of an immobile but emotionally expressive poet in Shob Charitro Kalponik, a famous Bengali actor in Autograph, a poet and folk singer in Moner Manush, a Portuguese-origin Bengali folk poet and his reincarnation in Jaatishwar, a disgraced police officer in Baishe Srabon and a depressed father in Shankhachil.

In 2012, he made a comeback to Bollywood through Shanghai and more recently Traffic. He has won numerous accolades throughout his career, including 7 Bengal Film Journalists' Association – Best Actor Awards, 4 Kalakar Awards and 2 Filmfare Awards East. As a producer, he had won the National Film Award for Best Feature Film in Bengali for Shankhachil. Chatterjee produced the Rituparno Ghosh scripted the critically acclaimed television series Gaaner Oparey, which launched the careers of brothers Arjun Chakraborty and Gaurav Chakraborty and Mimi Chakraborty as well.

In 2016, he debuted in the non-fiction category of television with a 99-episode mini-series, titled Mahanayak. Produced by Shree Venkatesh Films and directed by Birsa Dasgupta, the show starred Paoli Dam, Tanushree Chakraborty and Priyanka Sarkar in other pivotal roles and was based on the life of a superstar of the 60s era — a life fraught with career highs and personal turbulence. Chatterjee has also hosted the family game show Banglar Shera Poribaar with Rachana Banerjee on Zee Bangla.

1983

1984 – 1990

1991 – 1995

1996 – 2000

2001 – 2005

2006 – 2010

2011 – 2019

2022 – present

References

Indian filmographies
Male actor filmographies